William Thomas Lewis (1748?–1811), known as "Gentleman" Lewis, due to his refined acting style, was an English actor. He was said to be "the most complete fop on the stage". In later life he went into theatrical management.

Early days in Ireland
The son of William Lewis, a linendraper on Tower Hill, London, later an actor and manager in Ireland, he was born at Ormskirk, Lancashire, in or about 1748 (there is disagreement about his birth date); he had a Welsh clerical background, and was rumoured to be a great-grandson of Erasmus Lewis. He was brought up in Armagh.

A juvenile actor from very young, Lewis first appeared as "Mr. Lewis" in the playbill when he acted Colonel Briton in Susannah Centlivre's comedy The Wonder. Under Willian Dawson, Lewis appeared (1770–71) at the Capel Street Theatre in Dublin. He rapidly became popular in the city. On 19 February 1771 he was Belcour in The West Indian by Richard Cumberland, a part he made his own. On 4 May 1772, at the Crow Street Theatre. Tate Wilkinson saw him play Romeo to the Juliet of Mrs. Sparks.

On the London stage
 
On 15 October 1773, in his character of Belcour in The West Indian, Lewis made his first appearance at Covent Garden Theatre, where he was well received. He remained there for the rest of his career, with excursions to Liverpool in the summers of 1776 and 1777, to Birmingham in 1779, and to Dublin in 1806. When in 1782 he became deputy-manager of Covent Garden, he practically restricted himself to comic and familiar parts.

Last years
Lewis's farewell to the public took place on 29 May 1809, at the Haymarket Theatre, where the company had moved, after the destruction of Covent Garden by fire. On that occasion he played Roger in The Ghost and the Copper Captain in Rule a Wife and have a Wife. He delivered an address, in which he said that he had been thirty-six years in the service of the public, and could not recall having once fallen under its displeasure. He died on Sunday, 13 January 1811, at his house in Westbourne Place, London.

Family
A member of his first Dublin company, Henrietta Amelia Leeson, who was a pupil of Charles Macklin, subsequently became Lewis's wife. They had three sons and two daughters. One son, Henry Lewis, appeared at Covent Garden, and played a few parts, with little success. He was then on the Dublin stage. He emmigrated to Norfolk, Va. in 1815. There he married young actress, Hanna (Ann) Nuskey. That marriage was brief.  ref. "The Theatrical Rambles of Mrs. and Mrs. John Green"

On 6 June 1803, in partnership with Thomas Knight, Lewis took a lease on the Liverpool Theatre, which after his death came to his son. Before his death he had, again with Knight, also taken the Manchester Theatre.

Notes

Attribution

External links

1748 births
1811 deaths
English male stage actors
English theatre managers and producers
Male actors from Lancashire
18th-century English male actors